The Bâton à feu, or Baston à feu (French for "Fire stick"), is a type of hand cannon developed in the 14th century in Western Europe. This weapon type corresponds to the portable artillery of the second half of 14th century.

The Bâton à feu at the Musée de l'Armée in Paris has an hexagonal cross-section, and looks like a steel tube. It weighs 1.04 kg, and has a length of 18 cm. Its caliber is 2 cm.

In order to facilitate handling, the metal piece was placed at the end of a wooden pole. The powder was ignited through a small hole at the top, with a red-hot steel stick.

See also
 Hand cannon

Notes

Artillery of France
Medieval artillery